The 61st Filmfare Awards South ceremony honouring the winners and nominees of the best of South Indian cinema in 2013 is an event held on 12 July 2014 at the Nehru Indoor Stadium, Chennai.

Awards and nominees

Main awards
Winners are listed first, highlighted in boldface.

Kannada cinema

Malayalam cinema

Tamil cinema

Telugu cinema

Technical Awards

Special awards

References

External links
 
 

Filmfare Awards South
2013 Indian film awards